Michał Murkociński (born 1964, in Kraków) is a Polish diplomat and arabist, serving as an ambassador to Syria (2008–2012), Egypt (2014–2018) and Sudan (since 2019).

Education and career  
Murkociński holds an M.A. in Arab studies from the Jagiellonian University (1990). He has been studying in Damascus, Cairo and Stanford University, as well. In the early 1990s, he was working as an Arabic language teacher.

In 1993, Murkociński joined the Ministry of Foreign Affairs. Following his secondment to the embassy in Cairo, he has been First Secretary at the embassy in Damascus (1996–2001). Between 2004 and 2006, he was working at the embassy in Beirut, taking also responsibility of chargé d'affaires. Afterwards, from 2006 to 2008, he was the director of the Department of Africa and the Middle East. In 2008, he started his term as an ambassador to Syria. Four years later, due to the outbreak of the Syrian Civil War, he closed the embassy and returned to Warsaw. For the next two years he was working as a deputy director of the aforementioned department. Between 2014 and 2018, he was the ambassador to Egypt, with accreditation to Sudan and Eritrea as well. In 2018, back in Warsaw, he was head of the Persian Gulf Unit at the Ministry. On 29 March 2019, he was appointed roving ambassador to Sudan.

Murkociński is married, with two sons. Beside Polish and Arabic, he speaks English, Russian, and French languages.

He authored several articles on Damascus Arabic.

Works

References 

1964 births
Ambassadors of Poland to Egypt
Ambassadors of Poland to Sudan
Ambassadors of Poland to Syria
Jagiellonian University alumni
Living people
Polish Arabists